Gunnar Svensson (born 30 March 1953) is a Swedish sports shooter. He competed in the men's 50 metre running target event at the 1976 Summer Olympics.

References

1953 births
Living people
Swedish male sport shooters
Olympic shooters of Sweden
Shooters at the 1976 Summer Olympics
Sportspeople from Karlstad